Jesus Velez Cruz (December 24, 1946 – October 3, 2001), better known by his stage name Ricky Belmonte, was a Filipino actor, popular during the 1960s as one of Sampaguita Pictures' talents.

Personal life
Belmonte was born as Jesus Velez Cruz on December 24, 1946 in Tondo, Manila to Cesar Cruz, Sr. and Milagros Velez. His screen surname was taken from the Belmontes, STAR magazine publishers who, in the 1960s, used to publish several movie magazines like Movie World, Movie Land, Movie Star, among others.

Family
He was survived by his three children - Renzo, Sheryl, and Patrick - by his marriage to actress Rosemarie Sonora from 1970 to 1986.

Filmography

Movies

Television

Death
He died on October 3, 2001 in a hospital at Medical Center Parañaque in Parañaque, four days after cerebral hemorrhage caused by a massive stroke, he was 54 and was buried at the La Loma Cemetery in Caloocan.

External links
IMDb/bio

1946 births
2001 deaths
Ricky
Filipino male film actors
Male actors from Manila
People from Tondo, Manila